Sacchetti may refer to:

People 
 House of Sacchetti, a noble Italian family
 Arturo Sacchetti (born 1941)
 Dardano Sacchetti (born 1944)
 Francesco Sacchetti
 Franco Sacchetti (c. 1330–c. 1400)
 Cardinal Giulio Cesare Sacchetti (1586–1663), unsuccessfully nominated by France for Pope in 1644 and 1655
 Ivano Sacchetti
 Massimo Sacchetti
 Romeo Sacchetti (born 1953)

Other 
 Pineta Sacchetti, urban park in Rome
 Sacchettoni, a type of pasta also called sacchetti